Richard W. Bulliet (born 1940) is a professor of history at Columbia University who specializes in the history of Islamic society and institutions, the history of technology, and the history of the role of animals in human society.

Early life and education
Bulliet grew up in Illinois. He attended Harvard, from which he received a BA in 1962 and a PhD in 1967. He is the grandson of Clarence Joseph ("C.J.") Bulliet, an art critic and journalist.

Work

Several of his books focus on Iran but deal also with the larger Muslim world, including The Patricians of Nishapur: a Study in Medieval Islamic History (1972), Conversion to Islam in the Medieval Period: An Essay in Quantitative History (1979), and Islam: the View from the Edge (1994). His books on a broader view of Islamic history and society include Under Siege: Islam and Democracy (1994) and The Case for Islamo-Christian Civilization (2004). His book The Camel and the Wheel (1975) brings together his interest in the histories of technology, animal domestication, and the Middle East, dealing for example with the significant military advantage early Muslim armies gained from a slight improvement in the design of cloth camel saddles. He would return to the history of animal domestication with his Hunters, Herders, and Hamburgers: The Past and Future of Human-Animal Relationships (2005).

Hunters, Herders, and Hamburgers: The Past and Future of Human-Animal Relationships presents the four stages of human-animal relationship history: separation (when humans began to consider themselves as fundamentally separate from animals), pre-domestication (rich in symbolic expression of animals), domestication (exploiting and taming animals for human use), and post-domestication (our current industrialized consumption and separation from domestic animals).

He is the writer and editor of books of more general interest as well, including The Columbia History of the Twentieth Century (editor, 1998), The Encyclopedia of the Modern Middle East (co-editor, 1996), and The Earth and Its Peoples: A Global History (co-author, 1997). He has also written several novels which draw on his knowledge of international politics and the Middle East, and is a promoter of the validity of comics as an art form.

His first fiction book, Kicked to Death by a Camel (1973), was nominated for an Edgar for "Best First Mystery". His other fiction includes Tomb of the Twelfth Imam (1979), The Gulf Scenario (1984), The Sufi Fiddle (1991), and The One-Donkey Solution (2011).

Bulliet's commentaries and opinion pieces on the Middle East have appeared in such newspapers The Guardian, New York Times International Edition, and Süddeutsche Zeitung.

According to an interview in Columbia magazine's Fall 2007 edition, Columbia President Lee C. Bollinger credits Bulliet with the idea for inviting Iranian President Mahmoud Ahmadinejad to speak on campus on September 24, 2007.

References

External links
Bulliet's address to the Dialogue among Civilizations, United Nations, New York City, 5 September 2000
Islam: The View from the Edge back cover matter

1940 births
Living people
Columbia University faculty
Harvard University alumni
American historians of religion
American medievalists
Historians of the Middle East
American Islamic studies scholars